Phase change may refer to:

 Phase transition, the transformation from one thermodynamic state to another.
 Phase-change memory, a type of random-access memory.
 Phase change (waves), concerning the physics of waves.